Giorgi Kakhelishvili (born May 22, 1987) is a Georgian football player who plays for Merani Tbilisi.

Club career
He made his Russian National Football League debut for FC Sakhalin Yuzhno-Sakhalinsk on July 19, 2014 in a game against FC Baltika Kaliningrad.

Honours
 Georgian Premier League champion: 2006/07.
 Georgian Cup winner: 2004/05, 2011/12.
 Georgian Super Cup winner: 2010.

References

1987 births
Living people
Footballers from Georgia (country)
Association football midfielders
Expatriate footballers from Georgia (country)
Expatriate footballers in Russia
FC Lokomotivi Tbilisi players
FC Metalurgi Rustavi players
FC WIT Georgia players
FC Dinamo Tbilisi players
FC Dila Gori players
FC Sioni Bolnisi players
FC Sakhalin Yuzhno-Sakhalinsk players